Chafik Besseghier (born 11 October 1989) is a French figure skater. He is a two-time International Cup of Nice champion and the 2016 and 2018 French national champion. He has won a total of fourteen senior international medals and finished in the top ten at three ISU Championships (2014 Worlds, 2013 Europeans, 2017 Europeans).

Personal life 
Chafik Besseghier was born in Grenoble, France. His parents are from Algeria, close to Oran, and he has two siblings.

On 14 February 2020, Besseghier married Ukrainian-Turkish ice dancer Alisa Agafonova.

Career

Early years 
Besseghier began skating at a relatively late age, almost 13, in August 2002. Within a year, he had landed all the double jumps, and was landing triples by the end of his second year. Training in Grenoble, he competed mostly domestically before making his ISU Junior Grand Prix debut in 2008.

In the 2009–2010 season, Besseghier won the bronze medal at the Crystal Skate of Romania and 2010 Triglav Trophy.

2010–2011 season 
In 2010, he was invited to his first senior Grand Prix event, the 2010 Trophée Éric Bompard. After landing his first quadruple-triple jump combination in the short program, he was in fourth place, with the second-highest technical score. He made several mistakes in the free skate and placed fifth overall.

2011–2012 season 
Prior to the 2011–2012 season, Besseghier spent several months working with Yuka Sato and Jason Dungjen at the Detroit Skating Club in Bloomfield Hills, Michigan. He was the silver medalist at the 2011 Coupe de Nice, where he won the free skate. Besseghier again competed at the Trophée Éric Bompard, coming in ninth. Competing with tendinitis in his knee, he won the bronze medal at the 2012 French Championships and placed 12th in his European Championship debut. At the end of the season, he moved from Grenoble to Paris.

2012–2013 season 
Besseghier was awarded a silver medal at the 2013 French Championships and placed ninth at the 2013 European Championships.

2013–2014 season 
Besseghier injured his ankle in October 2013 at the Master's de Patinage. He withdrew from his two Grand Prix assignments, the 2013 NHK Trophy and 2013 Trophée Éric Bompard. Besseghier placed 12th at the 2014 European Championships in Budapest. After scoring well at the International Challenge Cup, he was selected for his first World Championships. Setting personal best scores in both programs, he finished ninth overall at the event in Saitama, Japan.

2014–2015 season 
Besseghier was selected to compete at two Grand Prix events, the 2014 Skate America and 2014 Trophée Éric Bompard. He finished 7th and 9th at the two events, respectively. He withdrew from the 2015 Europeans and placed 18th at the 2015 Worlds.

2015–2016 season 
In late August 2015, Besseghier began visiting Russian coach Elena Buianova in Moscow, although Annick Dumont remained his main coach. He began the 2015–16 season by winning gold at the Lombardia Trophy and International Cup of Nice, before winning the French national title in December.

Besseghier withdrew from the 2016 European Championships after rupturing a ligament in his right ankle. He placed 20th at the 2016 World Championships in Boston. He trained under Dumont in Champigny-sur-Marne until the end of the season.

2016–2017 season 
Besseghier changed coaches ahead of the 2016–2017 season, deciding to rejoin Stanick Jeannette in Grenoble. He placed 9th at the 2017 European Championships in Ostrava, Czech Republic, and 17th at the 2017 World Championships in Helsinki, Finland. Due to his world result, France qualified a spot in the men's event at the 2018 Winter Olympics in Pyeongchang, South Korea.

2017–2018 season 
Besseghier was hospitalised from 29 September to 2 October due to a pneumothorax involving detachment of the pleura. He withdrew from his Grand Prix assignments.

Programs

Competitive highlights 
GP: Grand Prix; CS: Challenger Series; JGP: Junior Grand Prix

References

External links 

 
 
 
 

1989 births
Living people
French male single skaters
Sportspeople from Grenoble
French sportspeople of Algerian descent
Figure skaters at the 2018 Winter Olympics
Olympic figure skaters of France
Competitors at the 2011 Winter Universiade